Ann Helen Nu'uali'itia also known as Ann-Helen Rasmussen née Rasmussen (born 29 May 1990) is a Samoan and New Zealand netball player of Samoan descent who represents both Samoa and New Zealand internationally and plays in the positions of wing attack and centre. She made her maiden World Cup appearance representing Samoa at the 2019 Netball World Cup.

Her elder sisters Rachel Rasmussen, Grace Rasmussen and Roma Rasmussen are all netball players who have represented both New Zealand and Samoa in international level.

References 

1990 births
Living people
Samoan netball players
New Zealand netball players
2019 Netball World Cup players
Netball players from Auckland
University of Auckland alumni
New Zealand expatriates in Samoa